Qeshlaq-e Juq-e Olya (also Romanized as Qeshlāq-e Jūq-e ‘Olyā; also known as Qeshlāq Jūg-e ‘Olyā) is a village in Anguran Rural District, Anguran District, Mahneshan County, Zanjan Province, Iran. At the 2006 census, its population was 77, in 23 families.

References 

Populated places in Mahneshan County